Down Came a Blackbird is a 1995 American made for TV drama film directed by Jonathan Sanger and starring Raul Julia, Laura Dern, and Vanessa Redgrave. It was the final film appearance of Julia, filmed in October 1994. Julia died two weeks after production finished and a year before its release.

Plot summary
Tomás Ramírez (Raul Julia) is a professor who joins a clinic run by Anna Lenke (Vanessa Redgrave), a Holocaust survivor, psychologist and the clinic's proprietor, whose patients are also recovering Holocaust and torture victims. Among them is Helen McNulty (Laura Dern), a journalist tortured by the death squads of an unidentified Central American country controlled by a dictatorship. In time she grows close to Ramírez, but suspicions are aroused when three men attempt to detain him while he and McNulty are on a date. McNulty is able to photograph one of the assailants and sends the picture to a colleague for possible identification. Some time later, during one of the Scotch-fueled late night conversations between McNulty and Ramírez, he talks about a childhood friend who was an officer in the Army of his home country. Ramírez portrays his friend as a man who followed orders without questioning the morality of them, preferring to go along with his superiors in order to protect his family.

Eventually McNulty's colleague contacts the person in the picture and arranges a meeting where the man and his two associates identify themselves as police from Ramirez's home country. They inform McNulty that Ramírez is a fugitive and wanted for torture. Back at group therapy session in the clinic, McNulty violently confronts Ramírez with this revelation, where he confesses that the childhood friend he spoke of was really himself. Dr. Lenke and the patients escort Ramírez out of the clinic, where the police take him into custody. Before being taken away, Helen asks Ramírez why he came to the clinic, he explains that he wanted to forget his past, and says to her: "you made me feel human again". As the police car drives away, Anna comforts Helen and they go back inside the clinic so they can continue and eventually finish Helen's treatment.

Cast
 Raul Julia as Professor Tomas Ramirez
 Laura Dern as Helen McNulty
 Vanessa Redgrave as Anna Lenke
 Cliff Gorman as Nick "The Greek"
 Sarita Choudhury as Myrna
 Jay O. Sanders as Jan Talbeck
 Jeffrey DeMunn as Rob Rubenstein
 L. Scott Caldwell as Cerise
 Falconer Abraham as Kouadio
 Von Flores as Minh
 Amanda Smith as Professor's Wife
 Miguel Fernandez as Captain Alonso Delacrux
 Carlo Rota as Sergeant Manuel Ortega
 James Kidnie as Secret Police Agent
 Christian Vidosa as Head Torturer
 Angel Jara as Torturer #1
 Ramon Marroquin as Torturer #2
 Henry Perez as Torturer #3
 Osman Aboubakr as Torturer #4 (uncredited)

References

External links
 
 
 

1995 television films
1995 films
1995 drama films
American drama television films
Films scored by Graeme Revell
Showtime (TV network) films
1990s English-language films